Putucusi (possibly from Quechua phutu bud, -q a suffix, k'usi a cucurbit species, a small zucchini or Cucurbita pepo, "budding zucchini (or Cucurbita pepo)") is a round-shaped mountain located on the opposite side (northeast) of the Urubamba River to Machu Picchu in the Cusco Region of Peru.

"Putu Cusi" has been described by Quechua-speaking guides as "Happy Mountain". According to Glosbe Glosbe online Quechua-English dictionary, "Kusi" means "happy", and "Putuq" translates to "trapezoid". As the feature could be seen as a trapezoidal mountain that would align with this translation. It is important to recognize that Quechua has several dialects.

Putucusi, Machu Picchu ("old peak" in Quechua) and Huayna Picchu ("young peak") are considered apus or holy mountains by the local Quechua people.

Climbing 
The view of Machu Picchu from the summit requires a 1.5-hour trek up the mountain, with approximately 1,700 wood and rock steps. A recently discovered Inca Trail, the path lies just 10 minutes west of Aguas Calientes following the train tracks along the Urubamba River. The entrance is free.

The second half presents views of Aguas Calientes and the Urubamba River valley, as the trail ascends the eastern face of Putucusi in switchback fashion. The trail passes through native flora including pisonayes, q'eofias, alisos, puya palm trees, ferns and more than 90 species of orchids.

In spring 2011, floods wiped out the vertical ladder section of the climb, making an ascent impossible without professional climbing gear, but by August 2012, all the ladders had been replaced.

Updated to June 2016, the access to the trail has been restricted and forbidden, due to the lack of maintenance of the path. All the ladders are indeed destroyed and it's impossible and extremely dangerous to climb up without professional climbing equipment. 
Local rangers are monitoring the area and the entrance to avoid unauthorized accesses and prevent accidents.

Images

See also
Iperu, tourist information and assistance
Tourism in Peru

References 

Mountains of Peru
Mountains of Cusco Region
Sacred mountains